Esencial: Mónica Naranjo is the fourth greatest hits compilation by Spanish recording artist Mónica Naranjo released on 11 June 2013 through Legacy and Sony. The album includes all her hits, including promotional singles, three remixes, plus two songs which never were included in any of her albums, "Dream Alive" (2011) featuring Brian Cross, and "Insensatez" a song included on the compilation album Samba Pa Ti (2005).

Track listing

Release history

References

Mónica Naranjo compilation albums
2013 compilation albums
Legacy Recordings compilation albums
Sony Music compilation albums